History's Memory is a history book about historiography of United States history. It was written by Ellen Fitzpatrick and published by Harvard University Press in October 2004.

References

External links 

 

2004 non-fiction books
Historiography of the United States
Harvard University Press books
History books about the United States